Bryan Kearney is an Irish DJ/producer in electronic dance music, mostly in trance, particularly tech trance. His tracks have been remixed by the likes of Giuseppe Ottaviani, John Askew, Activa, and Heatbeat.

Biography
Bryan Kearney began DJing when he was 19 years old. As a DJ, he has been featured on Dublin's prime time radio shows such as Energy FM and Kiss FM. He has also performed in venues across the globe, playing at some of the world leading dance events including the Sunrise Festival in Poland, and Sensation White in Melbourne, Australia.

At the same time he started DJing, Bryan Kearney began producing and has since released tracks across many different genres of dance music. In 2006, he produced the song "Exactly" with John O'Callaghan, and it was remixed by one of his idols, Giuseppe Ottaviani of NU-NRG. "Exactly" was requested for no less than fifteen album compilations. His techno-flavored tune More To Life became the biggest selling download ever on Discover Records label. In 2010 Bryan set up his own Trance & Tech Trance label Kearnage Recordings, which has gained worldwide success over the last 10 years due to its consistency of releasing high quality music.

Discography

Singles & Collaborations
 Bryan Kearney - Goosebumps
 John O'Callaghan & Bryan Kearney - Restricted Motion
 John O'Callaghan & Bryan Kearney - Exactly
 Sneijder & Bryan Kearney - Proper Order
 Sneijder & Bryan Kearney - Next Level
 Bryan Kearney pres. Karney - I've Had My Fun
 Bryan Kearney pres. Karney - Ridiculous
 Bryan Kearney pres. Karney - Backbreaker
 Bryan Kearney - More To Life/Punchline
 Bryan Kearney presents Spunuldrick - The Walrus
 Bryan Kearney - You Will Never Be Forgotten
 Bryan Kearney - Stealth Bomber (Original Mix)
 Bryan Kearney - Awaken
 Bryan Kearney - Get The Edge
 Bryan Kearney - Punchline
 Bryan Kearney - Mexican Rave
 Indecent Noise & Brian Kearney - Uncommon World
 Bryan Kearney - The Nettle
 Bryan Kearney - Te Amo
- 2015 -
 Bryan Kearney - Comfort Zone
 Bryan Kearney pres. Karney - Say Nothing
 Bryan Kearney - The Next Chapter
 Bryan Kearney & Will Rees - Prime Example
 Bryan Kearney - Wake Up Call
 Bryan Kearney & Coming Soon - Activate
- 2016 -
 Bryan Kearney & Coming Soon - Anti Social Media
 Bryan Kearney & Will Atkinson - The Game Changer
 Bryan Kearney & Vini Vici - We Are The Creators
 Bryan Kearney presents Karney. - El Gato
 Bryan Kearney presents Karney. - Beg Your Pardon
 Bryan Kearney & Christina Novelli - By My Side
- 2017 -
 Bryan Kearney - Adrenaline
 Bryan Kearney & WAIO - Futura
 Bryan Kearney presents Karney. - Smiler
 Bryan Kearney & Plumb - All Over Again
- 2018 -
 Bryan Kearney & Berg - Deeper
 Bryan Kearney presents Karney feat. Shugz - Floorburn
 Bryan Kearney & Deirdre McLaughlin - Open My Mind
 Bryan Kearney - Something Out Of Nothing

Remixes

 2013 : Indecent Noise - Phobia (Bryan Kearney Remix)
 John Askew - Battery Acid (Bryan Kearney for the neighbour's Remix)
 Solarstone - Please (Bryan Kearney Remix)
 John O'Callaghan - Rotterdam (Bryan Kearney Remix)
 Dave Schiemann - Shade (Bryan Kearney Remix)
 Mix Factory - Take Me Away (Bryan Kearney's Planet Love MakeOver)
 Fire & Ice - Lost Emotions (Bryan Kearney Remix)
 Tony De Vit - The Dawn (Bryan Kearney Remix) 
 Melly - Arrival (Bryan Kearney Edit)
 Sean Tyas - Lift (Bryan Kearney Edit)
 Gareth Emery feat. Bo Bruce - U (Bryan Kearney Remix)
 Armin van Buuren feat. Jan Vayne - Senerity (Bryan Kearney Remix)
 Aly & Fila Feat. Rafif - Mother Nature (Bryan Kearney Remix)
 Plumb - Need You Now (How Many Times) (Bryan Kearney Remix)
 Armin van Buuren - Together (Bryan Kearney Remix)
 Easton feat. Roxanne Emery - Healing Rain (Bryan Kearney Remix)
 Dario G - Sunchyme (Brean Kearney Bootleg Mix)
 Bryn Liedl feat. Bethany Marie - Statues (Bryan Kearney Remix)
 Cosmic Baby - Fantasia (Bryan Kearney Remix)
 Gareth Emery feat. Bo Bruce - U (Bryan Kearney Remix)

Radio show
He also hosts a bi-weekly radio show/podcast called KEARNAGE, that airs on Afterhours.FM radio. It can also be downloaded as a podcast.

Awards and honors
 Voted as second best set at The Sunrise Festival 2008.
 Runner up in Best Producer category at the 2009 Irish Dance Music Awards (second to John O'Callaghan).
 In 2014, his remix of Gareth Emery's track "U" was voted tune of the year on Armin Van Buuren's popular radio show "A State Of Trance". His track "All Over Again" with Plumb was voted No. 2 in the "Tune Of The Year 2017."
 In 2022, his track "Take this" released in collaboration with Out of the dust feat. Plumb, was voted as the "Tune Of The Year" in the legendary Dutch radio show "A State Of Trance".

References

Year of birth missing (living people)
Living people
 Irish trance musicians
DJs from Dublin (city)
Electronic dance music DJs